The Greek Basket League Finals MVP, or Greek Basket League Playoffs MVP award (Greek: Ελληνικού Α1 Μπάσκετ Πρωταθλήματος Tελικός MVP) is the yearly Finals MVP award for the playoff finals of the 1st-tier professional basketball league in Greece, the Greek Basket League.

Greek Basket League Finals MVP award winners

Multiple Greek Basket League Finals MVP award winners

See also
Greek Basket League awards
Greek Basket League MVP

References

External links
 Official Greek Basket League Site 
 Official Greek Basket League YouTube Channel 
 Official Hellenic Basketball Federation Site 
 Basketblog.gr 
 GreekBasketball.gr 

Greek Basket League
Finals MVP
European basketball awards
Basketball most valuable player awards